The Xerces blue (Glaucopsyche xerces) is a recently extinct species of butterfly in the gossamer-winged butterfly family, Lycaenidae. The species lived in coastal sand dunes of the Sunset District of the San Francisco Peninsula in California. The Xerces blue is believed to be the first American butterfly species to become extinct as a result of loss of habitat caused by urban development. The last Xerces blue was seen in 1941 or 1943 on land that is now part of the Golden Gate National Recreation Area.

Name
The specific name derives from the French spelling of "Xerxes", the Greek name of the Persian kings Xerxes I and Xerxes II of the fifth century BC. An endangered invertebrate conservation group known as the Xerces Society is named after the Xerces blue.

Extinction and ecology
The species was first described and documented in 1852. It was characterized by blue wings with white spots. The butterflies fed on vegetation belonging to the genus Lotus and Lupinus. The loss of the Lotus plant that the butterfly fed on while in its larval stages is believed to be one reason for the extinction of the Xerces blue. The plant could not survive in the disturbed soils due to human development, and was no longer available to the Xerces blue. Lupin, Xerces blue's other vegetative food source, was not suitable for the larval stages. 

Preserved specimens are found in California Academy of Sciences, Bohart museum, and the Harvard Museum of Natural History.

Reestablishment efforts
Efforts are on to reestablish related butterflies in the Xerces blue's former habitat. The Palos Verdes blue (Glaucopsyche lygdamus palosverdesensis), which is considered a Los Angeles cousin of the Xerces, is being reared in labs. A new Xerces-like subspecies of the silvery blue (Glaucopsyche lygdamus), which the Xerces blue was thought to be a subspecies of has been discovered as well, and is being analyzed as a potential way to revive the Xerces blue.

References

External links
 Xerces.org – An invertebrate conservation society

Glaucopsyche
Butterflies described in 1852
Extinct insects since 1500
Extinct butterflies
Extinct animals of the United States
Natural history of the San Francisco Bay Area
Species made extinct by human activities